Emissary may refer to:
 Ambassador
 Apostle (disambiguation)
 Diplomat
 Emissaries (album), a 2006 album by black metal group Melechesh
 Emissary (hydraulics), channel by which an outlet is formed to carry off any stagnant body of water
 Emissary veins, valveless veins which normally drain the intracranial venous sinuses to veins on the outside of the skull
 Emissary (Internet Software), an early Internet suite
 The Emissary (TV series), 1982 Hong Kong TV series
 The Emissary (film), a 1989 South African thriller film
The Emissary, the US title of the Yoko Tawada novel The Last Children of Tokyo

Star Trek 
 Benjamin Sisko, called the Emissary to the Prophets by the Bajorans
 "Emissary" (Star Trek: Deep Space Nine), the pilot episode of Star Trek: Deep Space Nine
 "The Emissary" (Star Trek: The Next Generation), a second-season episode of Star Trek: The Next Generation